Sarah Hall (born 1974) is an English novelist and short story writer. Her critically acclaimed second novel, The Electric Michelangelo, was nominated for the 2004 Man Booker Prize. She lives in Cumbria.

Biography
Hall was born in Carlisle, Cumbria. She obtained a degree in English and Art History from Aberystwyth University before taking an MLitt in Creative Writing at the University of St Andrews, where she briefly taught on the undergraduate Creative Writing programme. She still teaches creative writing, regularly giving courses for the Arvon Foundation. She began her writing career as a poet, publishing poems in various literary magazines.

Her debut novel, Haweswater, is a rural tragedy about the disintegration of a community of Cumbrian hill-farmers due to the building of Haweswater Reservoir. It won the 2003 Commonwealth Writers' Prize (Overall Winner, Best First Book).

Her second novel, The Electric Michelangelo, set in early twentieth century Morecambe Bay and Coney Island, is the biography of a fictional tattoo artist. The novel was shortlisted for the Man Booker Prize in 2004, and again for the Commonwealth Writers Prize in 2005. In France, it was shortlisted for the Prix Femina Étranger 2004.

Her third novel, The Carhullan Army, won the 2007 John Llewellyn Rhys Prize and the James Tiptree, Jr. Award, and it was shortlisted for the 2008 Arthur C. Clarke Award.  In America, the novel was published under the title Daughters of the North. She was invited to become writer-in-residence by the Grasmere-based Ullswater Trust – an organisation which supports and encourages writers – while working on the book.

Her novel How to Paint a Dead Man was longlisted for the Man Booker Prize.

In 2013, she was included in the Granta list of 20 best young writers. In October 2013, she won the BBC National Short Story Award for "Mrs Fox". She won for a second time in 2020 for her story "The Grotesques". 

In 2016 Hall was elected Fellow of the Royal Society of Literature.

All her novels are published by Faber and Faber; she participates in writing tuition classes during in-residence writing courses run by The Faber Academy. Sarah Hall has lived both in the United Kingdom and in North Carolina.

Hall is a patron of Humanists UK.

Bibliography

Novels
 Haweswater (2002)
 The Electric Michelangelo (2004)
 The Carhullan Army (2007)
 How to Paint a Dead Man (2009)
 The Wolf Border (2015)
 Burntcoat (October 2021)

Short-story collections
 The Beautiful Indifference (2011)
 Mrs Fox (2014)
 Madame Zero (2017)
 Sudden Traveller (2019)

As contributor or editor
 Sex and Death: Stories (2016)

References

External links
 Sarah Hall at Contemporarywriters.com 

Living people
English women novelists
John Llewellyn Rhys Prize winners
People from Carlisle, Cumbria
Alumni of Aberystwyth University
Alumni of the University of St Andrews
Date of birth missing (living people)
Fellows of the Royal Society of Literature
1974 births